You Deserve a Drink: Boozy Misadventures and Tales of Debauchery is a memoir and cookbook written by YouTube personality and comedian Mamrie Hart. The book was published by Plume and released on May 26, 2015.

Plot
The book details humorous anecdotes and stories of Hart's life, with a cocktail recipe accompanying each chapter.

Critical reception
You Deserve a Drink was generally well-received by reviewers. Writing for The New York Times, actor and comedian Michael Ian Black stated that "Hart is a pull-no-punches comedian with a talent for self-deprecation in the guise of self-aggrandizement, a winning formula."

Colleen Stinchcombe, writer for She Knows said that "She is undeniably a funny lady, and her humor translates beautifully — even more powerfully, I'd argue — to the page. Her jokes have more time to build, her punchlines land harder. She's created an entirely hilarious read that will delight her current fans by giving them a pitcher-sized serving of her normally shot-sized jokes and entice new readers who have enjoyed recent books by other humor heavy-hitters."

References

Cookbooks
Debut books
2015 non-fiction books
American memoirs
Plume (publisher) books